Laurier is a census-designated place in Ferry County, Washington that neighbors the Canada–United States border. The nearest school district is Orient School District. According to the 2010 census, Laurier had one permanent resident.

Name origin
Russel's was the initial name but the namesake is uncertain. When seeking to establish a post office, Russel was discovered to have been an ex-convict, prompting a search for a new name. The Great Northern Railway, which arrived in 1902, chose Boawell from a combination of two settlers named Boath and Kidwell respectively. Kidwell preferred Laurier and that name prevailed as did the post office opened that year. Sir Wilfrid Laurier was prime minister of Canada from 1896 to 1911.

Infrastructure
The General Services Administration lists three buildings in Laurier, a border station and two border station residences, built in 1936. U.S. Route 395 runs through the community north to the Canada–U.S. border, where it becomes British Columbia Highway 395. The Avey Field State Airport is in Laurier and its runway crosses the border into British Columbia.

Climate
This climatic region is typified by large seasonal temperature differences, with warm to hot (and often humid) summers and cold (sometimes severely cold) winters. According to the Köppen Climate Classification system, Laurier has a humid continental climate, abbreviated "Dfb" on climate maps.

References

External links
Orient School District

Populated places in Ferry County, Washington
Populated places in the Okanagan Country